Acleris longipalpana is a species of moth of the family Tortricidae. It is found in South Korea, China, Japan and Russia (Ussuri).

The wingspan is 21–24 mm. There is one generation per year with adults on wing from July to August.

Their larvae feed on Pinus koraiensis.

References

Moths described in 1883
longipalpana
Moths of Asia